Crystal Gilmore (born ) is a Canadian retired female artistic gymnast, representing her nation at international competitions.

She participated at the 2000 Summer Olympics. She also competed at world championships, including the 2006 World Artistic Gymnastics Championships in  Aarhus, Denmark.

References

External links
 Crystal Gilmore at Sports Reference
 http://olympic.ca/team-canada/crystal-gilmore/
 http://cambridgeshf.com/inductee/crystal-gilmore/
 https://www.youtube.com/watch?v=S5G1mWktYTw
 https://www.youtube.com/watch?v=hup6LwwMAsQ

1983 births
Living people
Canadian female artistic gymnasts
Place of birth missing (living people)
Gymnasts at the 2000 Summer Olympics
Olympic gymnasts of Canada
Gymnasts at the 1998 Commonwealth Games
Gymnasts at the 2006 Commonwealth Games
Commonwealth Games medallists in gymnastics
Commonwealth Games bronze medallists for Canada
20th-century Canadian women
21st-century Canadian women
Medallists at the 1998 Commonwealth Games